Howard Hewlett Clark  (April 23, 1901 – January 21, 1983) was Primate of the Anglican Church of Canada from 1959 to 1971.

Born in Fort Macleod, Alberta, Clark attended the University of Trinity College in Toronto.  He was first appointed Curate of St. John the Baptist Norway in Toronto, Ontario in 1930. In 1932 he was made Curate of Christ Church Cathedral in Ottawa. He became Priest-in-Charge in 1938, Rector in 1939, and Dean and Rector from 1945 to 1953.  He was Bishop of the Diocese of Edmonton from 1954 to 1961 and Bishop of Rupert's Land from 1961 to 1970. He was elected Primate of the Anglican Church of Canada in 1959; and became metropolitan of Rupert's Land in 1961.

In 1970 Clark was made a Companion of the Order of Canada. From 1971 to 1982 he was Chancellor of Trinity College, Toronto.

References

External links
 

1901 births
1983 deaths
Anglican bishops of Edmonton
Anglican bishops of Rupert's Land
Metropolitans of Rupert's Land
20th-century Anglican Church of Canada bishops
Companions of the Order of Canada
Primates of the Anglican Church of Canada
Trinity College (Canada) alumni